Chantepérier is a commune in the Isère department in southeastern France. It was established on 1 January 2019 by merger of the former communes of Chantelouve (the seat) and Le Périer.

See also
Communes of the Isère department

References

Communes of Isère